Manuel Luna may refer to:

 Manuel Luna (actor) (1898-1958), Spanish actor
 Manuel Luna (judoka) (born 1945), Venezuelan judoka
 Manuel Luna (footballer) (born 1984), Mexican footballer